Lystrosauridae is a family of dicynodont therapsids from the Permian and Triassic time periods. It includes two genera, Lystrosaurus and Kwazulusaurus. Kwazulusaurus includes a single species, K. shakai, from the Late Permian of South Africa and Lystrosaurus includes many species from the Late Permian and Early Triassic of South Africa, India, and Antarctica.

References

Permian synapsids
Triassic synapsids
Lopingian first appearances
Triassic extinctions
Prehistoric therapsid families
Dicynodonts